K. V. Abdul Khader is a Communist Party of India (Marxist) (CPI(M)) politician from Thrissur and a member of the Kerala Legislative Assembly for the Guruvayoor constituency.

He is the son of K. V. Abu and Pathu and was born at Blangad on 6 June 1964. He is a photographer and political worker.

He was an active member of the Left Front while a youth. He was district president, Thrissur and state committee member of DYFI, area secretary of CPI(M). He was a reporter of Deshabhimani for a decade and was chairman of the Kerala State Wakf Board, first chairman of the Committee for the Welfare of Non-Resident Keralites, Kerala Legislative Assembly.

He is now CPIM Kerala State Control Commission Member and a district secretariat member, CPI(M), and Thrissur and Kerala Pravasi Sangham State general secretary.

He was elected to the Kerala Legislative Assembly in 2006, 2011 and 2016.

References 

1964 births
Living people
Malayali politicians
Politicians from Thrissur
Communist Party of India (Marxist) politicians from Kerala
Kerala MLAs 2006–2011
Kerala MLAs 2016–2021
People from Guruvayur